Joseph Charles, Hereditary Prince of Sulzbach (German: Joseph Karl; Sulzbach, 2 November 1694 – Oggersheim, 18 July 1729) was the eldest son of Theodore Eustace, Count Palatine of Sulzbach.

Life
The Sulzbach line was related to the Palatinate-Neuburg line who were Electors Palatine. The Elector of the Palatinate Charles III Philip failed to produce a legitimate male heir, as did his brothers. Joseph Charles, the eldest son of the Count Palatine of Sulzbach, was the heir apparent. On 2 May 1717 Joseph Charles married Countess Palatine Elizabeth Augusta Sophie of Neuburg (1693–1728), the daughter of Charles III Philip, a match intended to unite the two lines and prevented another succession war.

However, all the sons fathered by the couple died in infancy and only three daughters survived. In 1728 Elizabeth Augusta died in childbirth and Joseph Charles died the following year in Oggersheim. Therefore, the inheritance of Palatinate-Sulzbach and the eventual inheritance passed to Joseph Charles' brother John Christian Joseph and his family.

Joseph Charles was buried in the St. Michael's Church, Munich.

Issue
Karl Philipp August von der Pfalz (1718–1724) 
Innocenza Maria, Pfalzgräfin von der Pfalz (1719–1719) 
Elizabeth Augusta of Sulzbach (1721–1794), married Charles Theodore, Elector of Bavaria
Maria Anna, Pfalzgräfin von der Pfalz (1722–1790), married Clement, Duke of Bavaria and Count Palatine 
Maria Francisca of Sulzbach (1724–1794), married Frederick Michael, second son of Christian III, Duke of Zweibrücken
Karl Philipp August, Pfalzgraf von der Pfalz (1725–1728) 
A son, Pfalzgraf von der Pfalz (1728–1728)

Ancestry

References 
 Die Familienzweige der Pfälzischen Wittelsbacher, Herausgeber staatliches Liegenschaftsamt Heidelberg, Oskar Klausner, 1995 erschienen im K. F. Schimper Verlag Schwetzigen
 Hier Wittelsbach hier Pfalz – Die Geschichte der pfälzischen Wittelsbacher von 1214–1803, Pfälzische Verlagsanstalt, Landau 1986, 
 Karl Lochner: Schloss und Garten Oggersheim, Verlag der Pfälzischen Gesellschaft zur Förderung der Wissenschaften, Speyer 1960

1694 births
1729 deaths
People from Sulzbach-Rosenberg
House of Wittelsbach
Hereditary Princes of Sulzbach
Counts Palatine of Sulzbach
Heirs apparent who never acceded
Burials at St. Michael's Church, Munich
Generals of the Holy Roman Empire
Knights of the Golden Fleece of Austria
Sons of monarchs